The siege of Ostend was a two-week siege in 1745 of the port of Ostend, then in the Austrian Netherlands, during the War of Austrian Succession. A French army commanded by Count de Löwendal under the overall command of Marshal Saxe defeated a primarily British garrison commanded by the Austrian Governor of the town, Lieutenant-General .

The French Army had overrun much of the Austrian Netherlands after their success at the Battle of Fontenoy and the withdrawal of part of the British Army to deal with the Jacobite uprising at home.

Count de Löwendal, a German who had served in a high position in the Russian army before becoming a commander in the French Army, arrived with 30,000 troops outside of Ostend in August 1745. After a few days of fighting in the open the French began a bombardment of the town and within a week the garrison of 3,600 had surrendered. They were permitted to march out with honour and were escorted to Mons.

King Louis XV of France himself rode into the town on 3 September 1745.

Aftermath
The French Army went on to take possession of nearly all of the Austrian Netherlands. They were, however, later restored to Austria under the terms of the treaty of Aix-la-Chapelle in 1748.

References

External link

Conflicts in 1745
Ostend (1745)
Ostend
Ostend